Hagerty is a surname

People with this surname include:

 Barbara Bradley Hagerty, author and reporter for NPR
 James Hagerty (1909–1981), American White House press secretary under Dwight D. Eisenhower
 John K. Hagerty (1867–1945), American politician
 Julie Hagerty (born 1955), American stage, screen, and television actress and model
 Marie Hagerty (born 1964), Australian artist, painter and teacher
 Michael G. Hagerty (1954-2022), American actor
 Neil Hagerty (contemporary), American guitarist and songwriter and author
 Thomas J. Hagerty (fl. early 20th century), American Roman Catholic priest from New Mexico and labor activist
 William Hagerty (disambiguation)
 William F. Hagerty (born 1959), United States Senator for Tennessee

See also

 Haggarty (surname)
 Haggerty (surname)
 Heggarty (surname)

 Hagarty (surname)
 Hegarty (surname)
 Hegerty (surname)